Mowe Lake is a  lake that is located in northern Delta County, Michigan in the Hiawatha National Forest.  It is just south of the county line with Alger and Schoolcraft countries and about a half mile north of trail 2225 on trail 2692 (commonly referred to as Mowe Lake Road) passed the small ponds. There are primitive campsites and a small boat launch.  Other nearby lakes include Hugaboom Lake, Blue Lake, Corner-Straits Chain of lakes, Ironjaw Lake, and Round Lake.

See also
List of lakes in Michigan

References 

Lakes of Delta County, Michigan
Lakes of Michigan